Maizurah Abdul Rahim (born 15 April 1999) is a Bruneian sprinter. She competed at the 2016 Summer Olympics in Rio de Janeiro, in the women's 200 metres. She was the flag bearer for Brunei in the closing ceremony.

References

External links

1999 births
Living people
Bruneian female sprinters
Olympic athletes of Brunei
Athletes (track and field) at the 2016 Summer Olympics
Olympic female sprinters